Moulton is a hamlet in the Vale of Glamorgan, southeastern Wales. It lies off the A4226 road on the road, northwest of Barry and east of Llancarfan. The landmark of note is the Three Horse Shoes pub and restaurant which attracts visitors from all across the Vale of Glamorgan. To the south of Moulton is the small hamlet of Sutton.

References

Villages in the Vale of Glamorgan